Aydın Boysan (17 June 1921 – 5 January 2018) was a Turkish architect, academic, author and essayist.

Life and profession
 
Boysan was born in Istanbul; his father Esat was an accountant and his mother Nevreste was a teacher. After Pertevniyal High School he studied architecture in Academy of Fine Arts (later renameded as Mimar Sinan Fine Arts University). For 54 years (between 1945 and 1999) he served as an architect. During this period he won many architectural design competitions both at home and abroad. The total area of his building designs was about  
In 1954, he became the charter member of  the Chamber  of Architects.
He also became the first secretary general of the chamber. Later he served as the representative of the chamber in Istanbul. Between 1957 and 1972 he taught in the Istanbul Technical University.

As an author and essayist
Boysan was a well known name in Turkish journalism. In 1984 he founded Bas Printing House and published essay books. His essays are mostly about his memoirs and humor. He was also a columnist.  He wrote in Hürriyet  for ten years and in Akşam for three years.

Publications
The following is a list of Boysan's books:

Humor
Paldır Güldür
Yangın Var
 Umut Simit
 Yalan, Oldu mu Ya!
Fısıltı
 Dostluk
 Aldanmak
 Söylesem Bir Türlü.

Travel 
Dünyayı Severek( Vol.I, II, III)
 Yollarda 
Uzaklardan

Fiction 
Yıl 2046 Uzay Anıları,

Memoir 
İstanbul Esintileri
 Leke Bırakan Gölgeler
 Yaşama Sevinci
 Sev ve Yaşa
 Damlalar
 Zaman Geçerken
 Aynalar,
 Yüzler ve Yürekler 
 Felekten Bir Gün
 İstanbul’un Kuytu Köşeleri
 Neşeye Şarkı
 Nereye Gitti İstanbul?
Ne Hos Zamanlardi

References

1921 births
2018 deaths
Academy of Fine Arts in Istanbul alumni
Academic staff of Istanbul Technical University
Pertevniyal High School alumni
Turkish architects
Turkish columnists
Writers from Istanbul